William Workman High School is the only public high school located in City of Industry, California. It is one of four high schools in the Hacienda La Puente Unified School District. For sports part of the Montview League.

History
School was named after William Workman whom had great success in the Los Angeles area, before moving to Rancho La Puente.

School opened at the beginning of the 1967–68 school year. 1969, James Faul was the Principal, the current principal is Dr. Anna Corral.

Located in the City of Industry is the Workman and Temple Family Homestead Museum with William Workman being part of the history of the area. The building is a California Historic Landmark.

Athletics
Cheer
Cross Country
Baseball
Basketball
Football
Soccer
Softball
Tennis
Volleyball
Water Polo
Swimming
Golf
Track and field.

Championship Tradition

1969, Ben Rico at the track and field league finals set league records in the 100 and 440 yard dashes. Tom Lomax tripled jumped 48'-10" and 49'-11 1/2" to rank one of 1976 top Southern California prep jumpers. 1991, Myra Smith won the CIF Southern Section 2A shot put and discus.  The boys varsity basketball team was 196-90 under the leadership of coach Rich Skelton. The first official day of the basketball season, the Lobos varsity basketball team practiced after midnight, and slept the night in the gym. The midnight practiced began under coach Rich Skelton in 1974 (for five years) and was revived in 1982 with coach Tim Stimpfel. Four of five of these years Workman won league.  
 1984, boys varsity basketball team won CIF 2-A division championship game.  2013, boys varsity basketball team won the Montview League championship four out of five years in a row.  Workman has won several CIF southern section wrestling championships, Mike Ramos (1987 4A 165-Lb), Raymond Molina (1989 3A 145-Lbs), Justin Ferrenti (2001 V 152-Lbs), and Cesar Martin (2001 V 171-Lbs).

Dave McGuire 7'-0" center averaged 18 rebounds per game during the 1977 basketball season.

1987, Richard Horrmann started the space shuttle club, created a Challenger time capsule, and was selected to serve on committee to select a new school principal.

1985 Workman hosted the annual Fast Action Summer Basketball Camp that included former Los Angeles Lakers players Keith Erickson and Brad Holland.  2018 Workman hosted the Superstar Basketball League.

Teacher gaining recognition was John Horn whom in 1975 was awarded California Biology Teacher of the Year by the National Association of Biology Teachers.

Musical Excellence
 2012 Marching Band Finalist SCSBOA 1A Division Championships
 2013 Marching Band Finalist SCSBOA 2A Division Championships
 2014 Marching Band Finalist SCSBOA 2A Division Championships
 2015 Marching Band Finalist SCSBOA 3A Division Championships
 2016 Marching Band Finalist SCSBOA 3A Division Championships
 2017 Marching Band Finalist SCSBOA 3A Division Championships
 2019 Marching Band 3rd Place (Bronze Medal) SCSBOA 1A Division Championships

Alumni
Norbert Davidds-Garrido, NFL football player.
Dave Farmer, NFL football player.
James Poff, class of 1977, played profession minor league baseball.
Corey Wright, class of 1997, played profession minor league baseball.
 Padma Lakshmi, Class of 1988, model and host of Top Chef.
 Steven Luevano, Class of 1998, boxer and WBO Featherweight Champion.
David Castañeda, actor.
Felicia Aguirre, graduate of Workman High School (Valedictorian) and University of Southern California with a degree in Aerospace Engineering. Recently has worked as an Aerospace Engineer, an Army Officer for a Ranger Regiment, and on Cyber security.
Tedmund Dean Hall, class of 1980. Was voted athlete of year. Hero, died in line of duty Los Angeles County Fire Department, serving 27 years.
Bobby Miles, class of 2009. Basketball. Averaged 27 points and 14 rebounds per game; Montview League's Most Valuable Player twice. Received an NCAA Division 1 scholarship.
Chris Taylor, wrestling coach for ten years at Workman which included five league titles and three state champions.
Rhonda Wheatley Brocki. Won gold at the 1987 Pan-Am Games. On the 1983 Workman High School softball CIF tile winning team.
Cynthia D Rodriguez, class of 1983. Twenty-five years engineer in the research and development department for Biosense Webster (owned by Johnson and Johnson).

See also 
  Past Workman High School Team Championships
 Workman Football roster 2005 to 2020
 Workman boys Basketball roster 2004-2005 to 2020-2021
 Workman girls Basketball roster 2006-2007 to 2019-2020

References

External links 
 
 Official band website

High schools in Los Angeles County, California
Public high schools in California
City of Industry, California
Educational institutions established in 1967
1967 establishments in California